Prymary Colorz was an interracial R&B music group. The group was composed of members Marcus Dilley, Jonathan Thomas, Raj Nichols and Josh Royals.

The group released one album, If You Only Knew with producers like Rodney Jerkins, John and Dino Elephante, Robin Thicke, and featuring guest singer such as Vickie Winans; its title track peaked at #1 on the Billboard Hot Singles Sales chart and #78 on the Billboard Hot 100 chart. It has been their most successful single to date.

During 2002, Prymary Colorz opened for Swedish pop group A-Teens on their Pop 'til You Drop! tour, and appeared in concert with R&B singer Mario in December of that same year.

In 2003, they contributed to the song "My Perfect Friend" from the "Macho Man" Randy Savage studio album, Be a Man.

The group disbanded in 2004.

Discography

Albums
2002: If You Only Knew #61 U.S. R&B Albums

Singles

References

External links

 Prymary Colorz on YouTube

American rhythm and blues musical groups